Rip Raps Plantation, also known as the James McBride Dabbs House, is a historic plantation house and national historic district located near Sumter, Sumter County, South Carolina. It was the home of James McBride Dabbs, author and leading advocate for social justice and civil rights (1896-1970).

It was added to the National Register of Historic Places in 1978.

Architecture
The structure encompasses four contributing buildings, three contributing sites, and two contributing structures. The house was built in 1858, and is a two-story, frame vernacular Greek Revival dwelling with twin facades. Each facade features a two-story, full width, pedimented portico supported by six paneled piers. Also on the property are a log smokehouse (c. 1830), a two-story carriage house (c. 1830), and a barn.

Ownership

According to Edith Mitchell Dabbs the land under Rip Raps Plantation was "given to Peter Mellette" in the 1750s.  It was subsequently purchased by the great-grandfather of James McBride Dabbs. 

After James McBride Dabbs' death it was willed to his wife, Edith Mitchell Dabbs, and subsequently their son, James M. Dabbs, Jr. (1937–2004), after Edith passed in 1991.

References
Footnotes

Sources

External links
Everything Happens at the Crossroads

Plantation houses in South Carolina
Historic districts on the National Register of Historic Places in South Carolina
Agricultural buildings and structures on the National Register of Historic Places in South Carolina
Greek Revival houses in South Carolina
Houses completed in 1858
Houses in Sumter County, South Carolina
National Register of Historic Places in Sumter County, South Carolina